WYGO (99.5 FM, "Y99.5") is a radio station licensed to serve Madisonville, Tennessee, United States.  The station is owned by Major Broadcasting Corporation. It airs a hot adult contemporary music format.

The station was assigned the WYGO call letters by the Federal Communications Commission on August 9, 1991.  These call letters were used on the same frequency at another station in Corbin, Kentucky, from 1978-1989 (now WKDP-FM) and at an AM station in Atlanta, Georgia from 1989-1990 (now WXJO).

References

External links

YGO
Hot adult contemporary radio stations in the United States
Radio stations established in 1993
Monroe County, Tennessee
1993 establishments in Tennessee